James Hurst (born 31 January 1992) is an English footballer who plays for  side Tamworth, where he plays as a defender.

His professional career saw him play club football in the Premier League for West Bromwich Albion, in the Football League for Blackpool, Shrewsbury Town, Chesterfield, Birmingham City, Crawley Town and Northampton Town, and in the Icelandic Úrvalsdeild for ÍBV and Valur. Internationally, he represented England at levels from under-16 to under-20.

Professional career
Hurst was born in Sutton Coldfield, West Midlands. He came through the ranks at West Bromwich Albion, but declined to sign for them, opting instead for a scholarship with the 2008 FA Cup winners, Portsmouth, who reportedly beat Arsenal, Manchester United and Aston Villa to his signature. He never made a first team appearance for Portsmouth, but did have a loan spell at Icelandic club ÍBV during the summer of 2010, where he scored one goal.

Hurst rejoined West Bromwich Albion on a two-year deal in September 2010 after Portsmouth's relegation from the Premier League. He made his debut for Albion on 1 December 2010 in the League Cup quarter-final clash with Ipswich Town which ended in a 1–0 defeat at Portman Road.

On 31 August 2011, Hurst was sent out on loan to Blackpool for the entire season, on condition that he could be recalled at any time. He made his debut as a substitute in the 1–1 draw with Cardiff City on 17 September. On 21 October he was recalled to his parent club.

On 18 November, he joined League Two side Shrewsbury Town on a six-week loan. Shrewsbury Town were seeking to extend his loan, but on 11 January 2012, Hurst joined League One team Chesterfield on loan until the end of the season.

Hurst signed for Championship club Birmingham City on 1 October 2012 on a one-month youth loan, and made his debut the following day, as a second-half substitute in a 2–1 defeat at Cardiff City. Fitness problems resulted in Paul Robinson being preferred, and Hurst made just three appearances before returning to Albion.

Hurst signed for Icelandic club Valur in May 2013. After less than two months, he returned to England to join Crawley Town of League One on a one-year contract. On 17 January 2014, Hurst signed for Northampton Town on a month's loan. On 27 February 2014, Hurst's contract at Crawley Town was cancelled by mutual consent. He rejoined Valur for another spell on 11 March 2014.

Non-league
On 2 July 2014, Hurst joined Hednesford Town of the Conference North. He signed for Conference Premier club Torquay United for the following season, but was suspended by the club from all football activities pending an investigation over an alleged incident on a night out in November 2015. He then moved on loan to divisional rivals Guiseley.

Hurst signed for AFC Telford United in May 2016, reuniting with former Hednesford manager Rob Smith. After being sent off in a match against Salford City in October, he was involved in an argument with supporters on social media, leading to his suspension and a club investigation into his behaviour. He was subsequently transfer-listed by the club and fined two weeks wages.

Hurst signed for Dover Athletic on 4 January 2017. He made his debut for the club in their 2–2 draw with York City, coming off the bench at half-time to replace Sammy Moore. He was released at the end of the season and signed a one-year contract with National League club Wrexham.

He left Wrexham on 13 March 2018 by mutual consent.

He was signed by National League North side Nuneaton Borough for the 2018/19 season, however, after only 5 games, he signed for National League South side Welling United.

It was confirmed on 27 December 2018 that Hurst had joined his home town club Sutton Coldfield Town. On 1 June 2019, he returned to Hednesford Town.

His contract was terminated with Hednesford Town in January 2020. On 25 August 2020, he signed with Buxton.

On 18 January 2022, Hurst signed for Southern League Premier Division Central rivals Tamworth. Hurst made his debut for Tamworth the same day, playing the full match in an away quarter final fixture against Leamington in the Birmingham Senior Cup, which the home side won 3-1.

Hurst set off on a pretty impressive goal scoring run, which coincided with the appointment of Andy Peaks as manager at Tamworth. In Peaks first match as manager, Hurst scored a brace in a 6-0 demolition of Barwell on the 26 February 2022 in a home Southern League Premier Division Central fixture.

James bagged an 82nd minute equaliser in the next match, an away Southern League Premier Division Central fixture at Hitchin Town on 28 February 2022. Hurst scored his forth goal for Tamworth on 19 March 2022, in a Southern League Premier Division Central fixture away at AFC Rushden & Diamonds, James scored the 37th minute to half the deficit after the home side had taken an early 2-0 lead, the game finished 2-2 with Jordaan Brown equalising in the second half.

Tamworth produced a newsletter on 9 May 2022, which confirmed that Hurst along with fellow defender Lucas Yeomans were in fact on longer term contracts, and would both remain with the club for the 2022–23 season.

On 20 August 2022, Hurst scored his first goal of the 2022–23 season in an away fixture against Bedford Town, Hurst came on as a 74th minute substitute for Alex Collard, and went on to score to make the score 8-0 to Tamworth on the 83rd minute, with the match finishing 8-1 to Tamworth.

Arrest
In June 2020, he was remanded in custody by a court in Glasgow after pleading guilty to acting in a threatening or abusive manner towards police officers following a domestic incident; he coughed in officers' faces, told them he had COVID-19, used derogatory language to describe a female police officer and shouted anti-Scottish abuse. He was sentenced to 160 hours unpaid community service.

Career statistics

Honours
Chesterfield
Football League Trophy: 2011–12

References

External links

James Hurst  at the Football Association website

1992 births
Living people
Sportspeople from Sutton Coldfield
English footballers
English expatriate footballers
England youth international footballers
Association football defenders
West Bromwich Albion F.C. players
Portsmouth F.C. players
Íþróttabandalag Vestmannaeyja players
Blackpool F.C. players
Shrewsbury Town F.C. players
Chesterfield F.C. players
Birmingham City F.C. players
Valur (men's football) players
Crawley Town F.C. players
Northampton Town F.C. players
Hednesford Town F.C. players
Torquay United F.C. players
Guiseley A.F.C. players
AFC Telford United players
Dover Athletic F.C. players
Wrexham A.F.C. players
Nuneaton Borough F.C. players
Welling United F.C. players
Sutton Coldfield Town F.C. players
Buxton F.C. players
Tamworth F.C. players
Úrvalsdeild karla (football) players
Premier League players
English Football League players
National League (English football) players
English expatriate sportspeople in Iceland
Expatriate footballers in Iceland